Water Lily Acoustics is an American record label in Santa Barbara, California founded in 1985 by Kavichandran Alexander, a Tamil from Sri Lanka. Alexander is a record producer and audio engineer. He named the label after his mother, Lily. The label primarily releases recordings of Indian classical music and collaborations by musicians from around the world. At its inception, the Alexander emphasized Eastern musicians, espousing the belief that they had seldom been recorded with proper sound quality compared to their Western counterparts. He began to include music from outside Asia. Alexander has recorded and produced musicians such as José Neto, Ali Akbar Khan, V. G. Jog, Vishwa Mohan Bhatt, Ry Cooder, Jerry Douglas, Béla Fleck, Taj Mahal, Papa Susso, Jiebing Chen, Simon Shaheen, Hungarian National Philharmonic, Philadelphia Orchestra, and the Saint Petersburg Philharmonic Orchestra. Music he has recorded has appeared in the films Angel Eyes, Dead Man Walking, and Meet the Fockers.

See also
 List of record labels

References

External links
Official site
Water Interview on TNT-Audio.com (2006)
Interview with Kavi Alexander

American independent record labels
Classical music record labels
Indian classical music